Sancta Maria refers to Saint Mary, mother of Jesus Christ.

Sancta Maria may also refer to:

Places
Sancta Maria Abbey, Nunraw, a Trappist (Ordo Cisterciensis Strictioris Observantiae) monastery
Sancta Maria College, girls Catholic voluntary secondary school in Ballyroan, Rathfarnham, Co. Dublin
Sancta Maria College, New Zealand, co-ed Catholic School in Auckland, New Zealand
Sancta Maria, Mater et Regina, Seminarium (also known as Saint Mary, Mother and Queen, Seminary), major seminary of the Archdiocese of Capiz, Philippines

People
Alphonsus a Sancta Maria, or Alphonso de Cartagena (1396–1456), Spanish historian
Honoratus a Sancta Maria (1651–1729), French Discalced Carmelite, known as a prolific controversialist. (secular name Blaise Vauxelles, also known by the French version of the name, Honoré de Sainte-Marie)
Tomás de Sancta María (ca. 1510 – 1570), Spanish music theorist, organist and composer of the Renaissance

Music
"Sancta Maria" (song), a classical aria based on the Intermezzo from the opera Cavalleria rusticana, composed by Pietro Mascagni
"Sonata sopra Santa Maria" ("Sancta Maria, ora pro nobis"), a section of Monteverdi's Vespro della Beata Vergine (1610)

See also
Sancta (disambiguation)
Saint Mary (disambiguation)
Santa Maria (disambiguation)
Sainte-Marie (disambiguation)
Saint Mary's (disambiguation)